Jorge Williams (born 1903, date of death unknown) was an Argentine tennis player. He competed in the men's doubles event at the 1924 Summer Olympics.

References

External links
 

1903 births
Year of death missing
Argentine male tennis players
Olympic tennis players of Argentina
Tennis players at the 1924 Summer Olympics
Tennis players from Buenos Aires
20th-century Argentine people